B. africana may refer to:

 Burkea africana, a tree species found in tropical Africa
 Bainella africana, an extinct trilobite species

See also
 Africana (disambiguation)